was Governor of Gifu Prefecture (1937–1941) and Saitama Prefecture (1941–1942).

1896 births
1972 deaths
Governors of Gifu Prefecture
Governors of Saitama Prefecture
Japanese Police Bureau government officials
Japanese Home Ministry government officials
University of Tokyo alumni
People from Mie Prefecture